Nelumbo nucifera, also known as sacred lotus, Laxmi lotus, Indian lotus, or simply lotus, is one of two extant species of aquatic plant in the family Nelumbonaceae. It is sometimes colloquially called a water lily, though this more often refers to members of the family Nymphaeaceae.

Lotus plants are adapted to grow in the flood plains of slow-moving rivers and delta areas. Stands of lotus drop hundreds of thousands of seeds every year to the bottom of the pond. While some sprout immediately, and most are eaten by wildlife, the remaining seeds can remain dormant for an extensive period of time as the pond silts in and dries out. During flood conditions, sediments containing these seeds are broken open, and the dormant seeds rehydrate and begin a new lotus colony.

Under favorable circumstances, the seeds of this aquatic perennial may remain viable for many years, with the oldest recorded lotus germination being from seeds 1,300 years old recovered from a dry lakebed in northeastern China. Therefore, the Chinese regard the plant as a symbol of longevity.

Part of this range (namely South India, Sri Lanka, Island Southeast Asia, and Australasia) may be the result of historic human introductions, but taxonomic authorities consider the species native to these areas. It has a very long history ( 3,000 years) of being cultivated for its edible seeds, and it is commonly cultivated in water gardens. It is the national flower of India and Vietnam.

Names 
Nelumbo nucifera is also known as Egyptian bean.

Classification

The lotus is often confused with the true water lilies of the genus Nymphaea, in particular N. caerulea, the "blue lotus." In fact, several older systems, such as the Bentham & Hooker system (which is widely used in the Indian subcontinent) refer to the lotus by its old synonym of Nymphaea nelumbo.

While all modern plant taxonomy systems agree that this species belongs in the genus Nelumbo, the systems disagree as to which family Nelumbo should be placed in, or whether the genus should belong in its own unique family and order.  According to the APG IV system, N. nucifera, N. lutea, and their extinct relatives belong in Proteales with the protea flowers due to genetic comparisons.  Older systems, such as the Cronquist system, place N. nucifera and its relatives in the order Nymphaeles based on anatomical similarities. According to the APG IV classification, the closest relatives of Nelumbo include the sycamores (Platanaceae).

Botany

The lotus roots are planted in the pond or river bottom soil, while the leaves float on the water's surface or are held well above it. The flowers are usually found on thick stems rising several centimeters above the leaves. Some cultivated varieties have extraordinary numbers of petals. For example, the Chinese variety qian ban lian ("thousand petals lotus") can have between 3000 and 4000 petals in a single blossom  and the Japanese variety ohmi myoren ("strange lotus") can have between 2000 and 5000 petals, the greatest number recorded for any species of plant.

Researchers report that the lotus has the remarkable ability to regulate the temperature of its flowers to within a narrow range just as humans and other warmblooded animals do. They suspect the flowers may be doing this to attract coldblooded insect pollinators. Studies published in the journals Nature and Philosophical Transactions: Biological Sciences were in 1996 and 1998 important contributions in the field of thermoregulation in plants. Two other species known to be able to regulate their temperature include Symplocarpus foetidus and Philodendron selloum.

Lotus seeds can remain viable after long periods of dormancy. In 1994, a seed from a sacred lotus, dated at roughly 1,300 years old ± 270 years, was successfully germinated.

The traditional sacred lotus is only distantly related to Nymphaea caerulea, but possesses similar chemistry.  Both Nymphaea caerulea and Nelumbo nucifera contain the alkaloids nuciferine and aporphine.

The genome of the sacred lotus was sequenced in May 2013.

Cultivation 
In colder climates, having a deeper water level protects the tubers more effectively, and overall is helpful for better growth and flowering. The sacred lotus germinates at temperatures above . Most varieties are not naturally cold-hardy, but may readily adapt to living outdoors year-round in USDA hardiness zones 6 through 11 (with some growers having success in zones as low as 4 or 5); the higher the zone’s number, the greater the adaptability of the plants. In regions with low light levels in winter, the sacred lotus has a period of dormancy. The tubers are not cold-resistant, if removed from water, and exposed to the air; when kept underwater in soil, the energy-rich tubers can overwinter temperatures below . If the plants are taken out of the water for wintertime storage (mostly in exceptionally cold climates), the tubers and roots must be stored in a stable, frost-free location, such as a garage, preferably in a cardboard box or container filled completely with vermiculite or perlite. Care must be taken to fully insulate the tubers.

Planting 
The sacred lotus requires a nutrient-rich and loamy soil. In the beginning of the summer period (from March until May in the northern hemisphere), a small part of rhizome with at least one eye is either planted in ponds or directly into a flooded field. There are several other propagation ways via seeds or buds. Furthermore, tissue culture is a promising propagation method for the future to produce high volumes of uniform, true-to-type, disease-free materials.

The first step of the cultivation is to plough the dry field. One round of manure is applied after ten days, before flooding the field. To support a quick initial growth, the water level is relatively low and increases when plants grow.

Harvest 

The stolon is ready to harvest two to three months after planting. It must be harvested before flowering. Harvesting the stolon is done by manual labor. For this step, the field is not drained. The stolon is pulled out of the water by pulling and shaking the young leaves in the shallow water.

The first leaves and flowers can be harvested three months after planting. Flowers can be picked every two days during summer and every three days during the colder season. Four months after planting, the production of flowers has its climax. The harvest of flowers is usually done by hand for three to four months.

Seeds and seed pods can be harvested when they turn black four to eight months after planting. After sun drying for two to three days, they are processed by mechanical tools to separate seed coats and embryos.

The rhizomes mature to a suitable stage for eating in approximately six to nine months. Early varieties are harvested in July until September and late varieties from October until March, after the ponds or fields are drained. The large, starch rich rhizomes are easy to dig out of the drained soil. In small-scale production, they are harvested by hand using fork-like tools. In Japan and on bigger farms manual labour harvesting is fully replaced by machines.

Varieties and cultivars 
Lotus varieties have been classified according to their use into three types: rhizome lotus, seed lotus, and flower lotus. Varieties that show more than one of these characteristics are classified by the strongest feature.

Rhizome lotus 
Rhizome lotus cultivars produce a higher yield and higher quality rhizomes than seed or flower lotus cultivars. Furthermore, this group grows tall and produces few to no flowers.

Cultivars can be classified by harvest time or by the depth of rhizomes into these types:
 Pre-mature (early) cultivars are harvested before the end of July, serotinous (late) cultivars from September on, and mid-serotinous or mid-matutinal cultivars are in between these harvest times. Using pre-mature cultivars, rhizomes can be harvested earlier and sold for a higher price.
 Adlittoral, deep, and intermediate cultivars are distinguished according to the depth in which the rhizomes grow underground. Adlittoral cultivars range from  depth and are often premature. They develop faster due to higher temperatures in surface soil layers. When harvested in July, adlittorals have higher yields than deeper-growing cultivars, but not necessarily when harvested in September. Rhizomes of adlittoral cultivars are crisp and good for frying purposes. They are often serotinous and can harvest high yields. Their rhizomes are starch-rich.
The main popular Nelumbo nucifera cultivars in China are Elian 1, Elian 4, Elian 5, 9217, Xin 1, and 00–01. The average yield of these cultivars is 7.5–15 t/ha (3.3-6.7 tons/acre) of harvest in July and 30–45 t/ha (13-20 tons/acre) of harvest in September. In Australia, the cultivar grown for the fresh rhizome market in Guangdong and Japan, the common rhizome cultivars are Tenno and Bitchu.

Seed lotus 

The characteristics of seed lotus cultivars are a large number of carpels and seed sets as well as large seeds with better nutritional properties. Roots of these varieties are thin, fibrous, and do not form good rhizomes. The main popular cultivars for seed production in China are Cunsanlian, Xianglian 1, Zilian 2, Jianlian, Ganlian 62, and Taikong 36. Green Jade and Vietnam-Red are recommended cultivars for seed production in Australia.

Flower lotus 
Flower lotus cultivars are used exclusively for ornamental purpose, producing many flowers and the lowest plant height.

The seed production of flower lotus is typically poor regarding yield and quality. Flower types differ in the number of petals (single petals, double petals, or multi-petals) and their colours range from single colour in white, yellow, pink, and red to bi-colour, most often of white petals with pink tip or highlights.

The flowers are capable of producing ink used by artists such as Morrison Polkinghorne to produce abstract images of the landscapes of southern Asia.

One example of a flower lotus is Wanlian. Bowl lotuses come in various colours and numbers of petals, and they bloom longer than other species of lotus. But together with the rhizome, their seeds are often too small or too hard to be eatable.

The sacred lotus may be crossed with the yellow lotus to produce interspecific hybrids. A few varieties have been produced with differing appearances.

Farming 
About 70% of lotus for human consumption is produced in China. A majority of lotus production takes place in managed farming systems in ponds or flooded fields like rice.

The most widely used system is crop rotation with rice and vegetables. This system is applicable if the propagule (small piece of rhizome) can be planted early in the year. The rhizomes are harvested in July, after which rice can be planted in the same field.  Rice is then harvested in October. From November until March, the field stays either free or terricolous vegetables, such as cabbage or spinach, are planted. Alternatively, the vegetable can also be planted after the harvest of the lotus.

Another alternative way is not to harvest the lotus rhizome, although it is ripe. A terricolous vegetable is planted between the rhizomes into the drained field. The rhizomes are then harvested next March.

A third way is to plant lotus in ponds or fields and raise aquatic animals such as fish, shrimp, or crab in the same field. A more efficient use of the water for both, the aquatic animal and the lotus production, has been identified with this planting pattern.

Use

Human consumption

Rhizomes 

The rhizomes of lotus are consumed as a vegetable in Asian countries, extensively in China, Japan, and India, sold whole or in cut pieces, fresh, frozen, or canned. They are fried or cooked mostly in soups, soaked in syrup or pickled in vinegar (with sugar, chili and garlic). Lotus rhizomes have a crunchy texture and are a classic dish at many banquets, where they are deep-fried, stir-fried, or stuffed with meats or preserved fruits. Salads with prawns, sesame oil or coriander leaves are also popular. Fresh lotus root slices are limited by a fast browning rate. Lotus root tea is consumed in Korea.

Lotus root is a popular vegetable in Sri Lanka, where it is often cooked in coconut milk gravy. In India, lotus root (also known as kamal kakdi) is cooked as a dry curry or sabzi.

Japan is one of the primary users of the rhizomes, representing about 1% of all vegetables consumed. Japan grows its own lotus but still must import 18,000 tons of lotus rhizome each year, of which China provides 15,000 tons yearly.

Rhizomes contain high amounts of starch (31.2%) without characteristic taste or odor. The texture is comparable to a raw potato. The binding and disintegration properties of isolated Nelumbo starch have been compared with maize and potato starch; Nelumbo starch is shown to be superior as an adjuvant in the preparation of tablets. When dried, N. nucifera is also made into flour, another popular use of this vegetable.

Pips 
Lotus pip tea is consumed in Korea.

Seeds 

Fresh lotus seeds are nutritious but also vulnerable to microbial contamination, especially fungal infections. Therefore, mostly dry lotus seed-based products are found on the market. Traditional sun baking combined with charcoal processing dries the seeds but results in a loss of nutrients. Freeze-dried lotus seeds have a longer shelf life and maintain original nutrients, while no differences in flavour are found after rehydration compared to fresh lotus seeds.

Dry stored lotus seeds are sensitive to moisture and mold infestation; researchers continue to explore new ways to preserve fresh lotus seeds, such as radiation processing.

Lotus seeds can be processed into moon cake, lotus seed noodles and food in the forms of paste, fermented milk, rice wine, ice cream, popcorn (phool makhana), and others, with lotus seeds as the main raw material. Traditional Eastern medicine claims that fresh lotus seed wine has thirst-quenching, spleen-healing, and anti-diarrheal advantages after drinking, attributed to unspecified bioactive compounds. Lotus seed tea is consumed in Korea, and lotus embryo tea is consumed in China and Vietnam.

Stems 
Young lotus stems are used as a salad ingredient in Vietnamese cuisine, and as a vegetable ingredient for some soup and curry in Thailand, such as keang som sai bua (lotus stem sour soup) and keang kati sai bua (lotus stem in coconut milk curry)

In northern and eastern regions of India, the stalk of the flower is used to prepare a soup, kamal gatte ki sabji (Hindi: कमल गट्टे की सब्जी) and an appetizet, kamal kakdi pakode (Hindi: कमल ककडी पकौडे). In South Indian states, the lotus stem is sliced, marinated with salt to dry, and the dried slices are fried and used as a side dish. In Kerala (Malayalam: "താമര") and Tamil Nadu, this end product is called thamara vathal.

Leaves 

In China and Korea, lotus leaf tea is made from the leaves of the lotus. It is also used as a wrap for steaming rice and sticky rice and other steamed dishes in Southeast Asian cuisine, such as lo mai gai in Chinese cuisine or kao hor bai bua (Thai: ข้าวห่อใบบัว), fried rice wrapped in lotus leaf in Thai cuisine.

Vietnamese also use lotus leaves to wrap green young rice, cốm, which is eaten in autumn. The leaves impart a unique scent to the soft, moist rice.

Flowers 

In Korea, lotus flower tea (연꽃차 yeon'kkot-cha) is made from the dried petals of the white lotus.

The stamens can be dried and made into a fragrant herbal tea, or used to impart a scent to tea leaves (particularly in Vietnam). This Vietnamese lotus tea is called trà sen, chè sen, or chè ướp sen.

Risks 
The petals, leaves and rhizome can also all be eaten raw, but there is a risk of parasite transmission (e.g., Fasciolopsis buski): it is therefore recommended that they be cooked before eating.

Use in water treatment 
Nelumbo nucifera shows high potential for usage in wastewater treatment removing polluting compounds and heavy metals. It is able to grow in variable water conditions and in low light intensity. Various studies show the successful use of N. nucifera to counteract water eutrophication. The leaves of the floating lotus reduce sunlight reaching the lower part of the water. This suppresses algae growth in N. nucifera aquatic systems and thus, the oxygen content is up to 20% higher than in other aquatic plant systems. Due to intense agricultural practices, nitrogen and phosphorus pollution are major problems in aquatic systems. N. nucifera is able to assimilate a higher content of phosphorus than aquatic plants currently used for water remediation (such as water hyacinth). It also assimilates nitrogen ("denitrification") and creates a habitat for bacterial growth in the water body. Through rhizofiltration, heavy metals – including arsenic, copper, and cadmium – can be removed efficiently from the water. The results observed are impressive showing 96% of copper and 85% cadmium metals removed after a seven-day incubation period. The accumulation of heavy metals doesn't show morphological symptoms of metal toxicity; however, the rhizome quality for human consumption needs further study.

Storage and commercialization 
Currently, most rhizomes are consumed fresh, and it is not common to store them due to their poor shelf life performance. This limits export possibilities for low-income production countries in Asia. Rhizomes quickly lose water, oxidation occurs and nutrient composition changes within a short time after harvest. There are three different approaches to storing rhizomes. By stacking the rhizomes, they are storable and remain fresh for about three weeks. Special stacking with silver sand and soil results in five to six layers that prevent water loss, thus, the rhizome stays fresh for up to two months. However the method is not suitable for commercialization but rather for home use. Hydrogen sulfide fumigation reduces enzymatic browning and therefore ensures rhizome quality. Dipping the rhizomes in a salt solution prevents oxidation and bacterial reproduction, which allows storage for up to five months and greater export ability. This treatment is related to the high cost and inefficient cleaning process before eating the rhizomes.

Use in bioengineering 
Nelumbo nucifera contains some thermal-stable proteins that might be useful in protein bio engineering processes. The proteins are characterized by seed longevity used for cell protection and repair under stress. There are also several indications that compounds of N. nucifera are used in drug fabrication in human health research for multiple purposes.

Other uses
The distinctive dried seed heads, which resemble the spouts of watering cans, are widely sold throughout the world for decorative purposes and for dried flower arranging.

In Asia, the petals are sometimes used for garnish, while the large leaves are used as a wrap for food, not frequently eaten (for example, as a wrapper for zongzi).

A unique fabric called lotus silk, from the lotus plant fibers, is produced only at Inle lake, Myanmar, and in Siem Reap, Cambodia. This thread is used for weaving special robes for Buddha images called kya thingan (lotus robe).

Chemical composition
The flavonol miquelianin, as well as the alkaloids (+)-(1R)-coclaurine and (−)-(1S)-norcoclaurine, can be found in the leaves of N. nucifera. The plant also contains nuciferine, neferine, and many other benzylisoquinoline alkaloids with medicinal properties.

Health properties and nutrients

Traditional medicine 

All parts of Nelumbo nucifera are edible, with the rhizome and seeds being the main consumption parts. Traditionally rhizomes, leaves, and seeds have been used as folk medicines, Ayurveda, Chinese traditional medicine, and oriental medicine. While leaves are used for hematemesis, epistaxis, and hematuria, the flowers are used for lowering blood sugar levels, diarrhea, cholera, fever, and hyperdipsia. Rhizomes have purported diuretic, antidiabetic, and anti-inflammatory properties. In Chinese medicine, seeds are still used as Lian Zi Xin (蓮子心).

Lotus rhizomes and seeds and their processing by-products are widely consumed in Asia, the Americas, and Oceania for high content of physiologically active substances. Especially in China, lotus seeds are popular with a cultural history going back about 3000 years. As early as the Han Dynasty, lotus seeds were already recorded as sweet, astringent, nourishing the heart and kidney in "Shen Nong's Herbal Classic." Nowadays there are 22 varieties for the four known Chinese lines, which are found particularly in Jianning (still called "the town of Jianlian lotus seeds in China") and Guangchang ("the town of white lotus seeds in China").

These days the perennial aquatic herb is gaining popularity because of its nutraceutical and historical importance It will be of economic value if the different parts of lotus can be developed as functional food. Because of the special role in human health and richness in nutrients and bioactive substances, the Chinese Ministry of Health approved the use of N. nucifera as both "food and medicine."

Rhizomes 

Lotus root is a moderate-calorie root vegetable (100 g of root stem provides about 74 calories) and is composed of several vitamins, minerals, and nutrients:  83.80% water, 0.11% fat, 1.56% reducing sugar, 0.41% sucrose, 2.70% crude protein, 9.25% starch, 0.80% fiber, 0.10% ash and 0.06% calcium.  100 g of root provides 44 mg of vitamin C or 73% of daily recommended values (RDA).

Lotus rhizome and its extracts have shown diuretic, psychopharmacological, anti-diabetic, anti-obesity, hypoglycemic, antipyretic and antioxidant activities.

Seeds 
Lotus seeds are mostly oval or spherical, with sizes varying according to varieties. They are generally 1.2–1.8 cm long, with diameters ranging from 0.8 to 1.4 cm and a weight of 1.1–1.4 g. After lotus seeds have been decorticated and peeled, they are edible and rich in nutrients and can be dried for storage. Their nutritional values can differ due to culture environments and varieties.

Not only do these seeds contain proteins of high quality and are rich in a variety of essential amino acids including high contents of albumin (42%) and globulin (27%), they also contain unsaturated fatty acids, carbohydrates, vitamins, calcium, iron, zinc, phosphorus and other trace elements. They also provide water-soluble polysaccharides, alkaloids, flavonoids, superoxide dismutase, and other bioactive components.

Lotus seeds also contain particularly large amounts of vitamins, including VB1, VB2, VB6 and Vitamin E.

The functional components (polyphenols, protein, polysaccharides) in N. nucifera seeds can help combat high blood pressure, diabetes, and gallstones. Lotus seed's water-soluble polysaccharides have also been shown to promote lymphocyte transformation and enhance the immune function.

After lotus seed germination, crude protein and fat levels in the endosperm significantly increase. It is therefore an important method to enhance its nutritional quality.

Cultural and religious significance

Nelumbo nucifera is a lotus species with historical cultural and spiritual significance. It is a sacred flower in both Hinduism and Buddhism, representing the path to spiritual awakening and enlightenment. In Christianity, the lotus flower is often associated with the apostle Thomas and his coming to India. It was also an important symbol in ancient Egypt, where it represented the path from death to rebirth to the afterlife.

In Asian art a lotus throne is a stylized lotus flower used as the seat or base for a figure. It is the normal pedestal for divine figures in Buddhist art and Hindu art, and is often seen in Jain art.  Originating in Indian art, it followed Indian religions to East Asia in particular. Lotus flowers are also often held by figures.

The Nelumbo nucifera, which is also called (Nilufar Abi in Persian), can be seen in many reliefs of the Achaemenid period (552 BC) such as the statue of Anahita in the Persepolis. Lotus flower was included in Kaveh the blacksmith's Derafsh and later as the flag of the Sasanian Empire Derafsh Kaviani. Today, it is the symbol of Iranians Solar Hijri calendar.

See also
 Bingdi lotus
 List of vegetables
 The Lotos-Eaters
 Lotus
 Lotus position
 Lotus-eaters
 Palmette
 Tulsi

References

Getty, Alice, The gods of northern Buddhism : their history, iconography and progressive evolution through the northern Buddhist countries, 1914, Oxford, fully online

External links

 

nucifera
Flora of temperate Asia
Flora of tropical Asia
Flora of Eastern Europe
Garden plants
Root vegetables
Medicinal plants
National symbols of India
Plants in Hinduism
Decorative fruits and seeds
National symbols of Vietnam
Rhizomatous plants
Asian vegetables
Thermogenic plants
Symbols of Haryana
Soma (drink)
Plants in Buddhism